

National team

 Russia score given first

Key
 H = Home match
 A = Away match
 F = Friendly
 ECQ = UEFA Euro 2008 qualifier

Leagues

Premier League

First Division

Second Division

2006–07 Russian Cup

2007–08 Russian Cup

 
Seasons in Russian football